Arctic Policy of Norway is Norway's foreign relations with other Arctic countries, and Norway's government policies on issues occurring within the geographic boundaries of "the Arctic" or related to the Arctic or its people. Since Norway is itself an Arctic nation, the Arctic Policy of Norway includes its domestic policies as regards the Norwegian Arctic region.

In Norway, development in the High North, including the Arctic, has been the government's highest foreign policy priority since 2005. The Norwegian Government's High North strategy was released December 1, 2006.

On March 12, 2009 Norway released the report “New Building Blocks in the North” which identifies seven priority areas: 1) climate and the environment; 2) monitoring-emergency response-maritime safety in northern waters; 3) sustainable development of offshore petroleum and renewable marine resources; 4) onshore business development; 5) infrastructure; 6) sovereignty and cross-border cooperation; and 7) the culture and livelihoods of indigenous peoples.

In the 2011 central government budget, a total of NOK 1.2 billion was set aside for initiatives in the High North, a significant portion of which was earmarked for research.

On April 21, 2017, the Norwegian Government released an updated version of its High North Strategy: "Norway's Arctic Strategy - between geopolitics and social development". Its priority areas included "international cooperation, business development, knowledge development, infrastructure, [and] environmental protection and emergency preparedness".

See also
Arctic cooperation and politics
Arctic Council
Northern Norway
Nordic Council
Nordic model
Nordic Investment Bank
Territorial claims in the Arctic
Visa policy of Svalbard

References

External links
 Norway's Arctic Council Chair page
 http://www.regjeringen.no/upload/UD/Vedlegg/strategien.pdf Norwegian Government's High North 
Strategy
 GeoPolitics in the High North (a research programme led by the Norwegian Institute for Defence Studies)

Foreign relations of Norway
Svalbard
Norway
Nordic politics